Sir Walter Fred Bodmer  (born 10 January 1936) is a German-born British human geneticist.

Early life
Bodmer was born in Frankfurt, Germany. He was educated at Manchester Grammar School and went on to study the Mathematical Tripos at the University of Cambridge as a student of Clare College, Cambridge. He was awarded his PhD in 1959 from Cambridge for research on population genetics in the house mouse and Primula vulgaris (primrose) supervised by Ronald Fisher.

Career and research
In 1961 Bodmer joined Joshua Lederberg's laboratory in the Genetics Department of Stanford University as a postdoctoral researcher, continuing his work on population genetics. In 1962 Walter Bodmer was appointed to the faculty at Stanford. He left Stanford University in 1970 to become the first Professor of Genetics at the University of Oxford .

Bodmer developed models for population genetics and worked on the human leukocyte antigen system and the use of somatic cell hybrids for human linkage studies. In 1985 he chaired a Royal Society committee which wrote The Bodmer Report; this has been credited with starting the movement for the public understanding of science.

Bodmer was one of the first to suggest the idea of the Human Genome Project. In 1987 he received the Ellison-Cliffe Medal from the Royal Society of Medicine. He was the director of research (1979–1991) and then Director General (1991–1996) of the Imperial Cancer Research Fund. He was also Chancellor of the University of Salford, England (1995–2005; succeeded by Sir Martin Harris) and Principal of Hertford College, Oxford (1996–2005; succeeded by Dr. John Landers).

In 2005, Bodmer was appointed to lead a £2.3 million project (roughly US$4.5 million) by the Wellcome Trust at the University of Oxford to examine the genetic makeup of the United Kingdom – the People of the British Isles project. He was joined by Oxford Professor Peter Donnelly (a population genetics and statistics expert) and the Wellcome Trust Principal Research Fellow Lon Cardon. Bodmer said, "Our aim is to characterise the genetic make-up of the British population and relate this to the historical and archaeological evidence." The researchers presented some of their findings to the public via the Channel 4 television series "Faces of Britain". On 14 April 2007, Channel 4 in Britain aired a program that highlighted the study's then-current findings. The project took DNA samples from hundreds of volunteers throughout Britain, seeking tell-tale fragments of DNA that would reveal the biological traces of successive waves of colonisers – Celts, Saxons, Vikings, etc. – in various parts of Britain. The findings showed that the Viking invasion of Britain was predominantly from Danish Vikings while the Orkney Islands were settled by Norwegian Vikings. This research was most recently presented at the Galton Institute's conference on 'New Light on Old Britons' in 2019. Bodmer had previously worked with the Galton Institute as its president from 2008 to 2014.

He has been Head of the Cancer and Immunogenetics Laboratory in the Weatherall Institute of Molecular Medicine at the University of Oxford since 1996. Research interests of the laboratory include the fundamental genetics and biology of colorectal cancer.

Honours and awards
Bodmer has won numerous awards including:

1972: Elected member of the American Academy of Arts and Sciences.
1974: Fellow of the Royal Society
1980: William Allan Award
1981: Elected member of the United States National Academy of Sciences.
1986: Knight Bachelor
1987: Ellison-Cliffe Medal from the Royal Society of Medicine.
1988: Honorary Degree (Doctor of Science) from the University of Bath.
1989: Elected member of the American Philosophical Society
1992: Honorary Fellow of the Royal Society of Edinburgh (FRSE)
1994: Michael Faraday Prize
2013: Royal Medal from the Royal Society
 1984: delivered the Royal Institution Christmas Lectures on The Message of the Genes.
 Honorary member, British Society for Immunology

His certificate of election to the Royal Society reads:

Personal life
Bodmer's father was Jewish so the family were obliged to leave Nazi Germany; in 1938, they settled in Manchester, England.  In 1956, Walter Bodmer married Julia Bodmer (née Pilkington) 1934–2001; she also became a well-known geneticist. They had two sons and a daughter. Lady Bodmer died in 2001.

Interviews

References

External links
Channel 4s "Faces of Britain"
 
Colorectal cancer research at the IMM
Catalogue of the archive of Sir Walter Bodmer and Lady Julia Bodmer held at the Bodleian Library, University of Oxford
 Portraits of Statisticians: Walter Bodmer
 Radio National Australia interview with Sir Walter
 

Human geneticists
1936 births
Living people
Jewish emigrants from Nazi Germany to the United Kingdom
English biologists
English geneticists
Knights Bachelor
English statisticians
Jewish scientists
Fellows of Hertford College, Oxford
Fellows of Keble College, Oxford
Fellows of the Royal Society
Foreign associates of the National Academy of Sciences
Presidents of the Royal Statistical Society
Presidents of the British Science Association
Chancellors of the University of Salford
Principals of Hertford College, Oxford
Royal Medal winners
People from Hesse-Nassau
People educated at Manchester Grammar School
Alumni of Clare College, Cambridge
Stanford University faculty
Academics of the University of Oxford
Presidents of the Association for Science Education
Recipients of the Dalton Medal
Members of the American Philosophical Society